Bhalchandra Vanaji Nemade (born 1938) is an Indian Marathi language writer, poet, critic and linguistic scholar. Beginning with his debut novel Kosala, Nemade brought new dimensions to the world of Marathi literature. This was followed by a tetralogy consisting of novels Bidhar, Hool, Jareela and Jhool. In 2013, Nemade published his magnum opus titled Hindu: Jagnyachi Samruddha Adgal which is regarded as his masterpiece. Nemade is a recipient of the Sahitya Akademi Award as well as the Jnanapith Award, the highest literary honour in India. In 2013, he was awarded the Padma Shri.

Life
Bhalchandra Nemade was born on 27 May 1938 in the village of Sangavi in the Khandesh region of Maharashtra. After doing his matriculation, he moved to Pune, and received his BA from Fergusson College in Pune and MA in Linguistics from Deccan College in Pune and English Literature from the Mumbai University in Mumbai. He received PhD and D.Lit. degrees from North Maharashtra University.

Nemade worked as a college teacher in several parts of Maharashtra. He spent a year in London teaching Marathi at the School of Oriental and African Studies. From 1973 to 1986, he taught English at Marathwada University in Aurangabad. In 1987, he was appointed as professor and head of department of English at Goa University. In 1991, he joined Mumbai University, from where he retired as the Gurudeo Tagore Chair for comparative literature studies. During 1960s, Nemade edited Marathi magazine Vacha.

Literary career

Nemade wrote his first novel Kosala in 1963. It is a fictitious autobiographical novel of one Pandurang Sangvikar, a youth from rural Maharashtra who studies in a college in Pune; but it is loosely based on Nemade's own life in his youth.

Sangvikar, the narrator in Kosala, uses everyday Marathi spoken in rural Maharashtra and his worldview also reflects that held by residents of rural Maharashtra. Kosala is a chronological autobiographical narration, yet it employs certain innovative techniques. Thus, Sangvikar describes one year in his life in the form of a witty diary. As another innovative technique, the narration describes "historical investigations" often undertaken by Sangvikar and his friend Suresh Bapat, which ultimately uncover to them the absurdity and tragedy of their present condition. Kosla is extensively translated into various languages including English, Hindi, Gujarati, Kannada, Assamese, Punjabi, Bengali, Urdu, Oriya, et al.

After Kosala, Nemade presented a different protagonist, Changadev Patil, through his four novels Bidhar, Hool, Jarila and Jhool. Another tetralogy begins with Hindu – Jagnyachi Samruddha Adgal in 2010 having Khanderao, the archaeologist as its protagonist.

The differences between Sangvikar and Patil are not confined to just their age, profession, habits, and intellectual and emotional perception: While Sangvikar at times keeps the world at bay or even rejects the world, Patil is all for the world and is forever engaged in confronting and understanding it. Sangvikar is mercurial, Patil is more realistic, whereas Khanderao's consciousness moves across 5000 years to Indus Valley culture in the Hindu tetralogy.

As a critic, Nemade's contribution rests in initiating Deshivad, a theory that negates globalisation or internationalism, asserting the value of writers' native heritage, indicating that Marathi literature ought to try to revive its native base and explore its indigenous sources. Nemade antagonised his contemporaries by contending that the short story is a genre inferior to that of the novel.

Nemade won the prestigious Jnanpith Award in February 2015. He was the fourth laureate receiving the award for work in Marathi language.

Winner of the Sahitya Akademi Award, he was conferred with Padma Shri in 2011 by Government of India.

Bibliography
Novels
 Hindu – Jagnyachi Samruddha Adgal], published by Popular Prakashan, Mumbai
 Kosala (Popular Prakashan, Mumbai
 Bidhar, Popular Prakashan, Mumbai
 Hool, Popular Prakashan, Mumbai
 Jarila, Popular Prakashan, Mumbai
 Jhool, Popular Prakashan, Mumbai

Poetry collections
 Melody, Vacha Prakashan, Aurangabad
 Dekhani, Popular Prakashan, Mumbai

Criticism
 Teekaswayamvar, Saket Prakashan, Aurangabad
 Sahityachi Bhasha, Saket Prakashan, Aurangabad
 Tukaram, Sahitya Akademi, New Delhi
 The Influence of English on Marathi : A Sociolinguistic and Stylistic Study, Rajahauns Prakashan, Panaji
 Indo-Anglian Writings: Two Lectures, Prasaranga Prakashan, Mysore
 Marathi For Beginners, Saket Prakashan, Aurangabad
 Marathi Reading Course (with Ian Raeside), S.O.A.S., Univ. of London.
 Nivadak Mulakhati, Loka Wangmaya Griha, Mumbai.
 Sola Bhashane, Loka Wangmaya Griha, Mumbai.
 Nativism (Desivad), Indian Institute of Advanced Study, Shimla
 How Much Space Does an Indian Writer Need?:Literary Standards-Native, Western, Global, Sahitya Academi, New Delhi

See also
 List of Indian writers

References

External links

 
Civil Services Junction, Civil Services Junction, 7 February 2015.
Reviving the true Hindu ethos, The Hindu, 3 July 2010.
Brahmins, Hindutva have ruined Hindu religion: Bhalchandra Nemade, DNA Mumbai, 26 July 2010.
‘हिंदू’ ही भूसांस्कृतिक संकल्पना – भालचंद्र नेमाडे, लोकसत्ता, 18 July 2010.
, Star Maaza, 27 July 2010.

  नेमाड़े ने गांवों में पलते भोले-भाले रिश्तों की तस्वीर को उकेरा है

1938 births
Living people
Recipients of the Jnanpith Award
Recipients of the Padma Shri in literature & education
Recipients of the Sahitya Akademi Award in Marathi
Poets from Maharashtra
Marathi-language writers
Marathi-language poets
20th-century Indian novelists
20th-century Indian essayists
Novelists from Maharashtra